Geman is a surname. Notable people with the surname include:

Donald Geman (born 1943), American mathematician
Hélyette Geman (born 1950), French academic in finance
Stuart Geman (born  1949), American mathematician, brother of Donald

See also
 German (disambiguation)